Sar Kalateh-ye Kafshgiri (also Romanized as Sar Kalāteh-ye Kafshgīrī; also known as Sar Kalāteh) is a village in Roshanabad Rural District, in the Central District of Gorgan County, Golestan Province, Iran. At the 2006 census, its population was 967, in 240 families.

References 

Populated places in Gorgan County